The Address is a 2014 documentary film for television written, co-produced and directed by Ken Burns. The documentary was released on April 15, 2014.

Synopsis
The Address follows a group of students from The Greenwood School, a boarding school in Putney, Vermont for boys in Grades 6-12 with special needs, such as dyslexia and ADHD as they prepare to recite the Gettysburg Address.

The documentary follows the students in their day-to-day lives at the boarding school, as they each prepare for the recital.  The boys receive a special coin upon successfully reciting the speech.  Burns used various students from the school to narrate historical background throughout the film.

Reviews
Brian Lowry of Variety said, "[I]t surely must have felt like something of a respite to play small ball for a while with "The Address," profiling a school for teenage boys with learning disabilities in Vermont, and the children for whom memorizing and reciting the Gettysburg Address is a rite of passage. Despite its relative lack of heft, the project is reasonably effective in providing a window into these kids' worlds, however narrow the aperture might be."

References

External links
'The Address'
Florentine Films

2014 television specials
American documentary television films
Documentary films about education
Documentary films about Vermont
Films directed by Ken Burns
PBS original programming